is a railway station located in Ibusuki, Kagoshima, Japan. The station is unmanned and opened in 1960.

Not to be confused with Oyama Station (Tochigi) which is served by the Ryomo Line, Mito Line, Utsunomiya Line, Shonan-Shinjuku Line and the Tohoku Shinkansen.

Lines 
Kyushu Railway Company
Ibusuki Makurazaki Line

Adjacent stations 

Railway stations in Kagoshima Prefecture
Railway stations in Japan opened in 1960
Ibusuki, Kagoshima